The president of the Federation of Bosnia and Herzegovina represents the Federation and is the head of the federal executive power. Term of the Federal President is 4 years. The post was established in March 1994.

The election of the Federal President consists of several activities. In electing the President and two Vice-Presidents of the Federation, at least one-third of the delegates of the respective Bosniak, Croat or Serb caucuses in the House of Peoples may nominate the President, and two Vice-Presidents of the Federation. After that, the House of Representatives needs to approve President and Vice-Presidents, and after that House of Peoples decides to confirm the decision of the House of Representatives by the majority of votes of all three caucuses.

The president can be dismissed from office after Federal Constitutional Court approves the request from the Parliament of the Federation of Bosnia and Herzegovina. Before the request was sent, two-thirds of Parliament need to vote for it.

There is an unwritten rule applied since 1999 that while the President is always of Croat ethnicity, the Prime Minister of the Federation of Bosnia and Herzegovina is a Bosniak.

List of presidents

See also
Presidency of Bosnia and Herzegovina
President of Republika Srpska

References

Politics of the Federation of Bosnia and Herzegovina